Sir John Gordon Hannam (born 2 August 1929) is a British Conservative politician. He was the last Conservative MP for Exeter to date, from 1970 until his retirement in 1997.

Early life
Hannam attended Yeovil Grammar School, where he matriculated. He served in the army, where he completed his National Service in the Middle East, and then in the Territorial Army. A keen sportsman, Hannam played hockey and tennis for Somerset, and was Singles Champion in 1953. Later, in Parliament, he Captained the Lords and Commons Tennis and Ski Teams, and is a Member of the All England Lawn Tennis and International Clubs.

Business

John built up his own business in Tourism and Hotels in the West Country which led him to maintain a strong interest in Small Businesses throughout his Parliamentary career. He was a member of the English Tourist Board and President of the British Motels Federation 1967–1980.

Parliamentary career

He won the marginal Exeter seat from Gwyneth Dunwoody in 1970 and held it through seven General Elections.
Once in Parliament he helped to launch the first backbench Energy and Small Businesses Committees and organized visits to coalmines, oil rigs and nuclear power stations as well as visits to research establishments in France and USA. He was elected Chairman of the Conservative Energy Committee 1974–1992. He was elected Secretary of the Conservative 1922 Committee, a position he held 1987–1997.

John's interest in the Arts stemmed from a love of music and singing (training as a singer and commanding several leading roles in light opera in his 20s) and he was elected Chairman of the Bow Group Arts Committee and Vice-Chairman of the Conservative Arts Committee. In 1980 the Government appointed him as a Trustee-Director of the National Theatre, where he was one of the longest serving members.

In 1989 he became a trustee-director of a newly created opera training company named British Youth Opera and took over chairmanship in 1997. Over a thousand young opera singers have developed their professional careers following training by BYO.

He stood down after 27 years in Parliament at the 1997 election. He disassociated himself from the bitter, homophobic campaign of his Conservative successor Adrian Rogers, who was a leading member of the religious right. For this he received praise from his successor, Labour's Ben Bradshaw, during his maiden speech in Parliament.

Disability Rights

The other main interest John Hannam developed in his 27 years in Parliament was as a leading campaigner for disability rights and the promotion of legislation to provide opportunities in education, employment, access to buildings and transport for people with disabilities. He was elected an officer of the All Party Disablement Group in 1974 and chairman from 1987 to 1997. He was appointed to the Government Transport Advisory Committee, the Snowdon Working Party on Disability, The Access Committee for England and Deputy Chairman of Rehabilitation International.

As a Council Member of Action Research he was a founder member of the Snowdon Trust which was created to financially assist severely physically disabled students in higher education and served as chairman from 1997 – 2012. He is currently a vice-president.

As part of the campaign for anti-discrimination he initiated several debates in the Commons and took a leading role in the passage of the Government 1995 Act which created the platform for many advances subsequently achieved.

He has been involved for many years with the Alzheimers Society and is currently a vice-president. He is also a Vice-President of the Disabled Motorists Association.

Private Members Bills

In 1986 John Hannam piloted his own Private Members Bill – The Corneal Tissue Act – through all stages and so made it possible for a thousand more people to retain their sight.
 
Then he followed in 1993 with another Bill to allow Disabled Drivers to become Driving Instructors.
In 1995 he succeeded in passing a third Bill – The Proceeds of Crime Act – which enabled the Courts to recover the ill-gotten gains from criminal actions.

Awards

In 1986 John was awarded an Honorary Degree at the Open University for Services to the Disabled and in 1994 he received the Harding Award for Parliamentary Work for the Disabled.

He was knighted in the 1992 New Year Honours.

He received the Freedom of the City of Exeter in 1998.

Personal life
In 1983 he married Vanessa Wauchope née Anson, who, as Vanessa Hannam, is an author and journalist. Lady Hannam has four children from her first marriage to John Wauchop, a second cousin of the Earl of Snowdon.

References

 "Times Guide to the House of Commons", Times Newspapers Limited, 1997 edition.

External links 
 

Conservative Party (UK) MPs for English constituencies
Knights Bachelor
Living people
Members of the Bow Group
People educated at Yeovil School
Politicians awarded knighthoods
1929 births
UK MPs 1970–1974
UK MPs 1974
UK MPs 1974–1979
UK MPs 1979–1983
UK MPs 1983–1987
UK MPs 1987–1992
UK MPs 1992–1997
Members of the Parliament of the United Kingdom for Exeter